Hayk, also known as Hayk Nahapet, is the legendary patriarch and founder of the Armenian nation. His story is told in the History of Armenia attributed to the Armenian historian Moses of Chorene (Movses Khorenatsi) and in the Primary History traditionally attributed to Sebeos. Fragments of the legend of Hayk are also preserved in the works of other authors, as well as in Armenian folk tradition.

Etymology 

The name of the patriarch, Hayk, is not exactly homophonous with the Armenian name for "Armenia," Haykʻ. In Classical Armenian, Haykʻ is the nominative plural of hay (հայ), the Armenian word for "Armenian." While Robert W. Thomson considers the etymology of Haykʻ (Հայք) from Hayk (Հայկ) to be impossible, other scholars consider the connection between the two to be obvious and derive Hayk from hay/Haykʻ via the suffix -ik. Armen Petrosyan proposes a possible connection between the name Hayk and the Proto-Indo-European *poti- "master, lord, master of the house, husband." Armenian historiography of the Soviet era connected Hayk and hay with Hayasa, a people mentioned in Hittite inscriptions. Some authors derive Hayk and hay from Khaldi/Ḫaldi, the chief god of the Urartian pantheon, and also identify Hayk with the Urartian deity.

The Armenian word հaykakan ("that which pertains to Armenians") derives from the name Hayk. Additionally, the poetic names for the Armenian nation, Haykazun (հայկազուն) or Haykazn (հայկազն, consisting of Hayk and azn "generation, nation, tribe"), also derive from Hayk (Haykazn/Haykaz later became a masculine given name among Armenians).

Genealogy 

Integrating the Armenian tradition into biblical tradition, Moses of Chorene describes Hayk as a descendant of Noah through the latter's son Japheth: "Yapheth begat Gamer [Gomer]; Gamer begat T‘iras; T‘iras begat T‘orgom [Togarmah]; T‘orgom begat Hayk." Hayk's descendants through his son Aramaneak (Aramanyak) are listed as follows: "Aramaneak begat Aramayis; Aramayis begat Amasya; Amasya begat Gełam [Gegham]; Gełam begat Harmay [Harma]; Harmay begat Aram; Aram begat Ara the Handsome." Hayk's other sons, according to Moses, were Khoṛ and Manavaz. Moses also gives the names of numerous other descendants of Hayk (Haykazunis, "of Hayk's lineage," also known as the Haykids), such as Sisak, Skayordi, Paruyr, and Vahe, some of which he identifies as kings of Armenia. In reference to Hayk's descent from Torgom/Togarmah, medieval Armenian sources sometimes referred to Armenia as T‘orgoma tun ("House of Torgom") and to Armenians as T‘orgomyan azg ("the people of Torgom"). The connection between Hayk and the descendants of Noah was created by Christian authors following the Christianization of Armenia in order to connect Armenians to the biblical narrative of human history.

In the Georgian history attributed to Juansher, Hayk is likewise identified as the son of Torgom/Togarmah and described as "prince of the seven brothers and stood in service to the giant Nimrod (Nebrovt') who first ruled the entire world as king."

One of Hayk's most famous scions, Aram (whose name Moses purports to be the origin of the name Armenia), settled in Eastern Armenia from the Mitanni kingdom (Western Armenia), when Sargon II mentions a king of part of Armenia who bore the (Armenian-Indo-Iranian) name Bagatadi (which, like the Greek-based "Theodore" and the Hebrew-based "Jonathan," means "god-given").

Legend 

According to the accounts of Moses of Chorene and the anonymous Primary History, Hayk fought against and killed the tyrannical Babylonian king Bel (Belos, Belus). Depending on the mythological tradition, Belus can refer to a symbolic Babylonian/Akkadian god of war or mythical founder of Babylon. Moses identifies Bel with the biblical Nimrod and gives a list of his ancestors and successors, drawing from the Bible and Abydenus via Eusebius's works. Bel may symbolize the Gutian dynasty of Sumer, which ruled remnants of Akkadia as a tyrannical power during a Mesopotamian Dark Age after the Akkadian Empire broke up in 2154 BC.

In Moses of Chorene's account (which he claims to have learned from Mar Abas Catina's writings), Hayk, son of Torgom, had a child named Aramaneak while he was living in Babylon. After the arrogant Titanid Bel made himself king over all, Hayk emigrated to the region near Mount Ararat with his extended family, servants, followers and about 300 warriors and founded a village called Haykashen. On the way he had left a detachment in another settlement with his grandson Kadmos. Bel sent one of his sons to entreat him to return, but Hayk refused. Bel decided to march against him with a massive force, but Hayk was warned ahead of time by Kadmos of his pending approach. He assembled his own army along the shore of Lake Van and told them that they must defeat and kill Bel, or die trying to do so, rather than become his slaves.

Moses writes that the armies of Hayk and Bel clashed near Lake Van "in a plain between very high mountains." King Bel was initially in the vanguard, but seeing that the outcome of the battle was uncertain, he withdrew to a hill to await the arrival of the rest of his army. Seeing this, Hayk slew Bel with a nearly impossible shot using his long bow, sending the king's forces into disarray. Hayk named the hill where Bel fell with his warriors Gerezmankʻ, meaning "tombs". He embalmed the corpse of Bel and ordered it to be taken to Hark‘ where it was to be buried in a high place in the view of the wives and sons of the king. Soon after, Hayk established the fortress or settlement (dastakert) of Haykʻ or Haykaberd at the site of the battle, which, Moses of Chorene says, is why the district is called Hayotsʻ Dzor ("The Valley of the Armenians") and the country of the Armenians is called Hayk‘.

The 18th- and 19th-century scholars Ghevont Alishan and Mikayel Chamchian, using different methods, calculated the date of the mythical battle (also known as the Dyutsaznamart, "Battle of the Giants") between Hayk and Bel to have been August 11, 2492 BCE or 2107 BCE, respectively.

Comparative mythology

Armen Petrosyan describes Hayk as "a complex epic figure that combines the characteristics of the god creator, the father and patriarch of gods, the thunder god, and the war god" that derives from Indo-European archetypes and influenced by Near Eastern mythology. Hayk is an etiological founding figure, like Asshur for the Assyrians, for example. The figure slain by Hayk's arrow is variously given as Bel or Nimrod. Hayk is also the name of the constellation Orion in the Armenian translation of the Bible. Hayk's flight from Babylon and his eventual defeat of Bel has been compared to Zeus's escape to the Caucasus and eventual defeat of the Titans. Petrosyan considers the Indian deity Rudra to be the most similar mythological figure to Hayk. Both are associated with the constellation Orion, both have descendants or followers of the same name (Hays and Rudras) and both are archers that kill their enemy with an arrow.

See also
 Hayko
 Aram (given name)
 Belus (Assyrian)
 Nimrod
 Armenian mythology
 Hayasa-Azzi
 Armens
 Sisak (eponym)

References

Notes

Citations

Bibliography 

Ancient Armenian people
Japheth
25th-century BC rulers
Armenian mythology
Nimrod
Legendary progenitors
Mount Ararat